Elgin is a census-designated place and unincorporated community in Scott County, Tennessee, United States. Its population was 282 as of the 2010 census. Elgin has a post office with ZIP code 37732, which opened on January 14, 1891.

Demographics

References

Census-designated places in Scott County, Tennessee
Census-designated places in Tennessee
Unincorporated communities in Tennessee